Vučić may refer to:

Vučić (surname)
Vučić, Serbia, a village in the municipality of Rača, Serbia